Next is the second album by Australian improvised music trio, The Necks, originally released on the Spiral Scratch label in 1990 and later re-released on Fish of Milk. The album differs from most of the trio's releases in that it features 6 tracks, rather than a lone track.

Reception
The Sydney Morning Herald reviewer described it as "Sublime. Six pieces, all of them beautifully played and perfectly controlled".

Track listing
All compositions by The Necks
 "Garl's" - 7:19
 "Nice Policeman Nasty Policeman" - 4:54
 "Pele" - 28:31
 "Next" - 9:49
 "Jazz Cancer" - 6:12
 "The World at War" - 16:35

Personnel
Chris Abrahams — piano
Lloyd Swanton — bass
Tony Buck — drums
Dave Brewer — guitar (track 2)
Michel Rose — pedal steel guitar (track 4)
Timothy Hopkins — alto saxophone, tenor saxophone (track 6)
Mike Bukovsky — trumpet (track 6)

References

1990 albums
The Necks albums